The AMX Chasseur de Chars (English translation: Hunter of Tanks or Tank Hunter), abbreviated as the "AMX CDC", was a tank destroyer concept, designed in 1946.

History 
After the Second World War, there was a pressing need for the French Army to acquire a modern tank with a heavy armament.

In 1946, the AMX company presented a lightly armoured 34 tonne tank destroyer based on the AMX M4 chassis, but fitted with a modern rounded sleek turret.

Armament 
The tank destroyer was equipped with the Canon de 90 mm SA mle. 1945 gun and had an autoloader. It can hold 90 shells.

Engine 
The powerful 1200 hp engine and light weight of the AMX CDC would have resulted in a fast tank destroyer. The AMX CDC can contain 1700 liters of gasoline allowing it to operate for six hours.

Development 
The project was terminated and no prototypes were built.

References 

Tank destroyers of the Cold War
Tank destroyers of France
Abandoned military projects of France
Tanks with autoloaders